Sinezona pauperata is a species of minute sea snail, a marine gastropod mollusc or micromollusk in the family Scissurellidae, the little slit shells.

Distribution
This marine species occurs off New Zealand.

References

 Powell A. W. B., New Zealand Mollusca, William Collins Publishers Ltd, Auckland, New Zealand 1979 
 Geiger D.L. & Marshall B.A. (2012) New species of Scissurellidae, Anatomidae, and Larocheidae (Mollusca: Gastropoda: Vetigastropoda) from New Zealand and beyond. Zootaxa 3344: 1–33

Scissurellidae
Gastropods of New Zealand
Gastropods described in 1933